Westbridge can refer to:

 Westbridge, British Columbia, a community in Regional District of Kootenay Boundary, Canada
 Westbridge, Massachusetts, a fictional town in Sabrina, the Teenage Witch (1996 TV series)
 Westbridge (LIRR station), a former railroad station in New York, United States
 Westbridge Technology, a former technology company now part of Progress Software
 PAREF Westbridge School, a private school for boys in Iloilo City, Philippines

See also
 West Bridge, technology in embedded computer architecture
 USS West Bridge (ID-2888), a cargo ship of the United States Navy during World War I